Staropuchkakovo (İśke Bośqaq) is a rural locality (a selo) in Chekmagushevsky District, Bashkortostan, Russia. The population was 276 as of 2010. There is 1 street.

Geography 
Staropuchkakovo is located 29 km southwest of Chekmagush (the district's administrative centre) by road. Novosemenkino is the nearest rural locality.

References 

Rural localities in Chekmagushevsky District